German submarine U-847 was a long-range Type IXD2 U-boat built for Nazi Germany's Kriegsmarine during World War II. Laid down in Bremen and launched on 5 September 1942.

Design
German Type IXD2 submarines were considerably larger than the original Type IXs. U-847 had a displacement of  when at the surface and  while submerged. She had two shafts and two  propellers.

U-847 was fitted with six  torpedo tubes (four fitted at the bow and two at the stern), 24 torpedoes, one  SK C/32 naval gun, 150 rounds, and a  SK C/30 with 2575 rounds as well as two  C/30 anti-aircraft guns with 8100 rounds. The boat had a complement of fifty-five.

Service history

She was commanded for her short career by four Knight's Cross recipients, each a U-boat ace in their own right, although she neither sank nor damaged any vessels. They were:
 Kapitänleutnant Friedrich Guggenberger
 Korvettenkapitän Wilhelm Rollmann
 Kapitänleutnant Jost Metzler
 Kapitänleutnant Herbert Kuppisch

She joined 4th Flotilla for training on 23 January 1943, where she remained until 30 June 1943. She then joined 12th Flotilla for active service until 27 August 1943 when she was sunk while providing logistical support for other U-boats operating in the area.

Fate
U-847 was sunk by air-launched FIDO torpedoes dropped from US Avenger and Wildcat aircraft operating from the escort carrier  on 27 August 1943 in the Atlantic Ocean at position . All 63 hands were lost.

References

Bibliography

External links

World War II submarines of Germany
German Type IX submarines
World War II shipwrecks in the Atlantic Ocean
U-boats sunk by US aircraft
U-boats commissioned in 1943
U-boats sunk in 1943
1942 ships
Ships built in Bremen (state)
Ships lost with all hands
Maritime incidents in August 1943